Andrew James Fenn (born 1 July 1990) is a British former professional cyclist, who rode professionally between 2011 and 2018 for four different teams.

Career

Junior and amateur years
Fenn competed in many sports as a child but concentrated on cycling from the age of 12 when he joined Welwyn Wheelers. His talent was noticed by British Cycling, and he joined their Olympic Development Programme in November 2006 and won the junior version of Paris–Roubaix in 2008, before moving on to the Olympic Academy Programme in 2009-2010.

At the 2010 Commonwealth Games, Birmingham-born Fenn – who was qualified to ride for Scotland as his mother was Scottish-born – finished 14th in the men's road time trial.

Turning professional
His first year riding as a professional was in 2011, in which he claimed two victories and the bronze medal in the under-23 road race at the Road World Championships.

Fenn retired from cycling following the disbanding of the  team at the end of the 2018 season.

Major results

2008
 1st Paris–Roubaix Juniors
 2nd  Team pursuit, UEC European Junior Track Championships
 2nd Madison, National Track Championships (with Jonathan Bellis)
 National Junior Track Championships
2nd Individual pursuit
3rd Kilo
 2nd Road race, National Junior Road Championships
2009
 2nd  Team pursuit, UEC European Under-23 Track Championships
 2nd  Team pursuit, 2009–10 UCI Track Cycling World Cup Classics, Melbourne
 3rd Madison, National Track Championships (with Alex Dowsett)
2010
 1st  Road race, National Under-23 Road Championships
 4th Overall Tour de Berlin
2011
 1st Memorial Van Coningsloo
 1st Stage 7 Tour de Bretagne
 2nd Road race, National Under-23 Road Championships
 3rd  Road race, UCI Under-23 Road World Championships
 3rd  Team pursuit, 2010–11 UCI Track Cycling World Cup Classics, Beijing
 4th Zellik–Galmaarden
 5th Paris–Roubaix Espoirs
2012
 1st Trofeo Palma
 1st Trofeo Migjorn
 1st Stage 2 (TTT) Tour de l'Ain
 4th Grand Prix Impanis-Van Petegem
 6th Omloop van het Houtland
 6th Münsterland Giro
 10th GP Raf Jonckheere
2013
 1st Gullegem Koerse
 5th GP Briek Schotte
 6th Overall Tour de Picardie
2014
 1st GP Briek Schotte
 5th Nokere Koerse
 6th Brussels Cycling Classic
 9th Overall Tour of Qatar
2015
 7th London Nocturne
2016
 3rd Road race, National Road Championships
 7th Trofeo Felanitx–Ses Salines–Campos–Porreres
2018
 5th Nokere Koerse

References

External links

1990 births
British male cyclists
British track cyclists
People from West Malling
Living people
Cyclists at the 2010 Commonwealth Games
Commonwealth Games competitors for Scotland
21st-century British people